The recurve-billed bushbird (Clytoctantes alixii) is a Thamnophilid antbird that inhabits dense stands of secondary vegetation at the northern end of the Andes in Colombia and Venezuela. It is named for its extraordinary bill, which curves upwards. Until 2007, the bird was almost unknown in life and apart from earlier specimens it had only been seen in life once at an army ant swarm in Colombia in 1965.

Discovery and rediscovery
The species was first described in 1870 by Daniel Giraud Elliot from a specimen obtained from the Rio Napo. He named the species after Dr. Edouard Alix (1823–1893) of Paris.

A significant effort in Colombia failed to find the bird. However, in April 2004 the species was found in Venezuela in the foothills of Sierra de Perijá close to the border with Colombia, during a Conservation International-financed Rapid Assessment (RAP) expedition consisting of ornithologists Miguel Lentino, Jorge Perez-Eman, Irving Carreño and Chris Sharpe working under the auspices of the Venezuela Audubon Society and the Phelps Ornithological Collection. The first photographs were taken of a pair of birds. Four months later the first sound recordings were made and behavioral notes taken by British ornithologist Chris Sharpe.

Working in parallel, Colombian ornithology student Oscar Laverde rediscovered bushbirds in Norte de Santander, Colombia in July 2005. The birds were subsequently studied in detail by Laverde, F. Gary Stiles and ornithology students of the Natural Sciences Institute of the National University of Colombia. Their findings are published in issue No. 5 of Ornitología Colombiana. They are better located using their call which is made up of four short whistling notes.

The first published photos of the species were circulated in June 2007 from images taken by Fundacion ProAves at a new reserve in Colombia to protect this species.

Features and conservation status
The bushbird is 16.5 cm (6.5 inches) long and unmistakable. The male is slate gray, the female rufescent brown. It inhabits well-developed secondary growth at 150–1750 m. It is insectivorous and a bamboo specialist.

The outlook for the bushbird in the foothills of Sierra de Perijá in Venezuela seems positive, and certainly much better than scientists had guessed before 2004. The bird appears to be not uncommon in regenerating swidden ("slash-and-burn") plots. A significant area of extremely important, uninhabited primary forest is being rapidly invaded in the foothills of this range where the forest is being felled to plant short-term cash crops. There appears to be little attempt to control or regulate illegal deforestation there by the Venezuelan government and local political support for the invasion. Despite the long-term consequences for the survival of the forest and its species, in the short term this may lead to creation of further bushbird habitat.

The bushbird should now be looked for in suitable area elsewhere. Sierra de Perijá is one of the top conservation priorities for birds in Venezuela, not just for this species but for several other threatened birds.

Notes

References

External links
National Geographic photographs
BirdLife Species Factsheet.
First published photographs of the recurve-billed bushbird by Fundacion ProAves.
Photographs of the recurve-billed bushbird from first rediscovery.
Wildlife Extra.com First ever photos of the recurve-billed bushbird.

recurve-billed bushbird
Birds of the Colombian Andes
Birds of the Venezuelan Andes
recurve-billed bushbird